Collarada peak is a mountain in the western Pyrenees of Huesca, situated on the northeastern Aragon near the towns of Villanúa (to the south) and Canfranc (to the west). The peak is 2,886 meters AMSL high, being the highest summit in the Jacetania comarca of Aragon.

A great view of this mountain can be obtained from Larres, a village that gained life again after its castle dated 14th century got restored by the "Amigos del Serrablo".

See also
List of Pyrenean three-thousanders

External links
 Villanúa Site

Mountains of Aragon
Mountains of the Pyrenees
Two-thousanders of Spain